The Australian Heritage Council is the principal adviser to the Australian Government on heritage matters. It was established on 19 February 2004 by the Australian Heritage Council Act 2003. The Council replaced the Australian Heritage Commission as the Australian Government's independent expert advisory body on heritage matters when the new Commonwealth heritage system was introduced in 2004 under amendments to the Environment Protection and Biodiversity Conservation Act 1999. The Council assesses nominations for the Australian National Heritage List and the Commonwealth Heritage List. The Minister may ask the Council for advice on action that he may take in relation to the List of Overseas Places of Historic Significance to Australia.

Role 
The Council plays a key role in assessment, advice and policy formulation and support of major heritage programs. Its main responsibilities are to:
 assess places for the National Heritage List and the Commonwealth Heritage List
 nominate places for inclusion in the National Heritage List or Commonwealth Heritage List
 promote the identification, assessment, conservation and monitoring of heritage
 advise the Minister on various heritage matters including the preparation and amendment of heritage strategies and management plans for Commonwealth areas and agencies

Publications 
 Protection of Australia's Commemorative Places and Monuments Report - 2018
 National Heritage Places map - 2017
 Australia's National Heritage List - the story so far - 2017
 'The Waters of Australian Deserts' Cultural Heritage Study - 2017
 A thematic heritage study on Australia's benevolent and other care institutions - Thematic Study and Companion Guide - 2016
 Rock Art Thematic Study - 2016
 AHC Submission on the Great Barrier Reef Strategic Assessment - 2014
 Identifying Commonwealth Heritage Values and Establishing a Heritage Register - 2010
 Guidelines for the assessment of places for the National Heritage List - 2009
 Standard Commonwealth Heritage Listing process - 2007
 Standard National Heritage Listing process - 2007

See also 
 Australasian Underwater Cultural Heritage Database
 Australian Heritage Database
 Historic Shipwrecks Act 1976 – superseded by the Underwater Cultural Heritage Act 2018

References

External links

 Australian Heritage Council Act 2003

2004 establishments in Australia
Nature conservation in Australia
Commonwealth Government agencies of Australia
National heritage organizations
Cultural heritage of Australia
Historic preservation in Australia